Henny Trylesinski, also known as Henny Trayles (4 June 1937 – 17 February 2022) was a German-born Uruguayan actress and comedian who lived in Argentina. Born in Hamburg, Germany, Trayles died on 17 February 2022, at the age of 84.

Television 
Telecataplúm, (1962)
Show Rambler, (1965)
Jaujarana, (1969)
Hupumorpo, (1975)
Comicolor, (1978)
Hiperhumor, (1980)
La viuda blanca, (1986)
Mi cuñado, (1993), Corina
Como vos & yo, (1998), Serafina
Verano del '98, (1998), Rosario
Buenos vecinos, (1999)
Franco Buenaventura, el profe, (2002), Margarita
Máximo corazón, (2002, Sara Sokolovski
Floricienta, (2004–2005), Greta
El código Rodriguez, (2006), María Julia de Rodríguez
Reparaciones, (2007), Lidia
Una de dos, (2008)
Todos contra Juan, (2008), Marta Perugia
Todos contra Juan 2, (2010), Marta Perugia
Graduados, (2012), Roxana Peicovich
Solamente vos, (2013)
Viudas e hijos del Rock & Roll, (2015), Ruth

References

External Links
 

1937 births
2022 deaths
20th-century Uruguayan actresses
21st-century Uruguayan actresses
Actresses from Hamburg
German emigrants to Uruguay
Uruguayan expatriate actresses in Argentina
Uruguayan television actresses
Uruguayan women comedians